Jumeken Sabiruli Najimedenov (1935–1983) was a Kazakh poet. He was born in Kurmangazy District, in Atyrau Province.

In 1956, he wrote the lyrics of the Kazakh patriotic song "My Kazakhstan" along with Shamshi Kaldayakov, who composed the music.

"My Kazakhstan" was modified in 2006 by then Kazakh president Nursultan Nazarbayev, and became the current anthem of the Republic of Kazakhstan.

References

1935 births
1983 deaths
Kazakhstani composers
Male composers
Kazakhstani musicians
National anthem writers
20th-century male musicians